Pereslavsky District  is an administrative and municipal district (raion), one of the seventeen in Yaroslavl Oblast, Russia. It is located in the south of the oblast. Its administrative center is the town of Pereslavl-Zalessky (which is not administratively a part of the district). Population: 20,352 (2010 Census);

Administrative and municipal status
Within the framework of administrative divisions, Pereslavsky District is one of the seventeen in the oblast. The town of Pereslavl-Zalessky serves as its administrative center, despite being incorporated separately as a town of oblast significance—an administrative unit with the status equal to that of the districts.

As a municipal division, the district is incorporated as Pereslavsky Municipal District. The town of oblast significance of Pereslavl-Zalessky is incorporated separately from the district as Pereslavl-Zalessky Urban Okrug.

References

Notes

Sources

Districts of Yaroslavl Oblast
